Begimbet, also known as Sarybulak, (Begımbet, بەگىمبەت; , Begimbet) is a town in Aktobe Region, west Kazakhstan.

Geography
The village is located near the southern end of the Greater Barsuki Desert.

References

Aktobe Region
Cities and towns in Kazakhstan